Asche is a German musical project, one which encompasses the spectrum of noise, power electronics, and droning ambient.  It is a staple act of Germany’s industrial and power noise record label, Ant-Zen.

Members / History

Asche’s lineup consists of one man, Andreas Schramm.  The term Asche is German for "ash", but is also an allusion to Schramm's name, which as often credited as A. Schramm.  Schramm was also a founding member of the industrial group Ars Moriendi, and is a co-member of the ritual-ambient project Templegarden’s and other projects KYAM and Monokrom.

Discography

That Loop In My Eye, Tape
Down By Loop, CD-R
Older Stuff, CD-R
Non Apocalypse, 1993, Tape / CD
Times, (with The Rorschach Garden), 1995, Tape
(split w/ Morgenstern), 1996, LP
S/T, 1998, Tape
(split w/ Templegarden’s), 1998, 10”
Erode (with Converter and Morgenstern), CD
Recycling Art, 2000, CD / Boxset
Distorted Disco, 2000, CD
Distorted DJ, 2003, 2CD / 2LP
Scenes From A Galton's Walk (with Synapscape), 2006, CD
The Easter Island Phenomenon, 2010, CD
Stonebrain EP (2011)

External links
   Official site

Noise musical groups